Dr. Navalar Nedunchezhiyan College of Engineering is a part of Arumugham Group Of Institutions, a social initiative of Arumuga Mudhaliar Sornam Educational Trust, Tittagudi.

History
The college was founded in 1995 by 'Kalvi Kavalar' Thiru.A.Krishnasuwami,M.A.,B.Ed. The chairman of this college is Lion.K.Raja Piradhapan,B.Sc.

Location

Accreditation and certification

This college has been approved by the AICTE and affiliated with Anna University.

Academic departments

B.E - Civil Engineering
B.E – Mechanical Engineering
B.E – Electrical and Electronics Engineering
B.E – Electronics and Communication Engineering
B.E – Computer Science and Engineering

Sister institutions
Sree Arumugam Polytechnic College, Vaidhiyanathapuram
Sree Arumugam Arts and Science College], Vaidhiyanathapuram
Sree Arumugham College of Education, Vaidhiyanathapuram
Sree Arumugam Teacher Training Institute, Vaidhiyanathapuram
Sree Renga Teacher Training Institute, Vaidhiyanathapuram
Dr. Navalar Nedunchezhiyan Matric (Hr.Sec) School, Tittakudi

References 

Private engineering colleges in Tamil Nadu
Colleges affiliated to Anna University
Education in Cuddalore district
Educational institutions established in 1995
1995 establishments in Tamil Nadu